Garrett is a census-designated place (CDP) in Walla Walla County, Washington, United States. The population was 1,419 at the 2010 census.

Geography
Garrett is located at  (46.062643, -118.384364). According to the United States Census Bureau, the CDP has a total area of 2.1 square miles (5.5 km2), all of it land.

Climate
According to the Köppen Climate Classification system, Apple Valley has a semi-arid climate, abbreviated "BSk" on climate maps.

Demographics
As of the census of 2000, there were 1,022 people, 407 households, and 291 families residing in the CDP. The population density was 482.4 people per square mile (186.1/km2). There were 419 housing units at an average density of 197.8/sq mi (76.3/km2). The racial makeup of the CDP was 92.56% White, 0.20% Native American, 1.17% Asian, 4.50% from other races, and 1.57% from two or more races. Hispanic or Latino of any race were 5.38% of the population.

There were 407 households, out of which 31.2% had children under the age of 18 living with them, 62.9% were married couples living together, 6.1% had a female householder with no husband present, and 28.5% were non-families. 24.8% of all households were made up of individuals, and 12.0% had someone living alone who was 65 years of age or older. The average household size was 2.51 and the average family size was 2.98.

In the CDP, the age distribution of the population shows 25.0% under the age of 18, 4.9% from 18 to 24, 24.6% from 25 to 44, 26.8% from 45 to 64, and 18.8% who were 65 years of age or older. The median age was 43 years. For every 100 females, there were 95.8 males. For every 100 females age 18 and over, there were 93.2 males.

The median income for a household in the CDP was $38,750, and the median income for a family was $48,203. Males had a median income of $38,854 versus $24,643 for females. The per capita income for the CDP was $18,895. About 3.3% of families and 8.0% of the population were below the poverty line, including 10.1% of those under age 18 and 5.4% of those age 65 or over.

References

Census-designated places in Washington (state)
Census-designated places in Walla Walla County, Washington